Kuttichathan Theyyam also known as Sasthappan Theyyam is a theyyam that is performed in northern parts of Kerala state in India. As the deity in Kuttichathan theyyam is associated with the Brahmin family from Kalakattu illam in Payyanur in Kannur district, this theyyam is also known as Kalakattu Kuttichathan.

Myth

Son of Shiva and Parvathi
When lord Shiva and Parvati disguised themselves as Valluvan and Valluvathi, they had two children named Karuval and Kuttichathan. They gave Kuttichathan, who was born with a black body and a flower on the forehead and three eyes, to a childless Namboodiri from Kalakatt illam. He send the child to a Guru for schooling. Kuttichathan, who was not ready to obey the Guru, began to adopt practices contrary to Brahmanical customs. Due to his extraordinary intelligence, the Guru could not answer many of the child's questions. Guru rebuked and beat Kuttichathan who did not obey him. As a revenge Chathan killed Guru and left the place.

Knowing this, Namboothiri told his wife Atholamma not to feed the starving child. When he was hungry and asked for milk, she rejected and in anger the boy killed a bull and drank his blood. In this, angry Namboothiri hacked Kuttichathan to death. But he reborn. Namboothiri brought in a large number of Brahmins and killed Kuttichathan and cut his body into 390 pieces and burned in 21 Homakundams (a type of holy kiln). There were many Kuttichathans born from that klins and they set fire to Nampoothiri's house and the nearby Brahmin houses. They decided to worship the persecuted Kuttichathan as Theyyam. This is the myth behind Kuttichathan theyyam.

Son of Namboothiri
Another story says Kuttichathan is the child born to Namboothiri and a backward Pulaya woman who used to sweep the house. Fearing embarrassment, the pregnant woman locked herself in a stone room and after birth the boy was secretly raised in the room. There are also stories that when he was growing up, he stole rice and paddy from the house and given to the poor lower caste people.

Another story says Kuttichathan is the child born to Namboothiri and a backward Pana woman. Only because he was born the son of an illegitimate woman, the son did not inherit the father's dominion. The child who grew up neglected became very naughty. Once, when he was thirsty for water, people insulted him by not giving water. The angry Kuttichathan slaughtered the bull and drank the blood to quench his thirst, and left the place and reached Lokanarkavu via Vadakara Kuttoth.

Appearance
Wearing a long rectangular waist, Kuttichathan Theyyam's headgear consists two pieces of wood on either side of the cheeks. Theyyam performer cover their eyes with a metallic cap with a central small hole to look at. The costume also contains a peacock-like extensions on their backs. Overall color is red.

Relation between Kuttichathan and Buddhism
Chathan is a Malayalam translation of the Pali / Sinhala word for Buddha. The word 'Kuttichathan' literally means 'Child Chathan'. It is believed that the Hindus who conquered the early Buddhist temples may have incorporated many of the Buddhist customs that existed there.

Different Types of Kuttychattan Theyyams 
Kuttychattan is a type of Theyyam, which is a popular ritual art form of North Kerala, India. Kuttychattan Theyyam is performed to appease the deity of the same name, who is believed to be a protective god of the village. Here are some different types of Kuttychattan Theyyams

 Kalluruttychathan Theyyam: This is one of the most popular types of Kuttychattan Theyyams. It is performed to appease the Kalluruttychathan deity, who is believed to be the protector of the village.
 Karinkali Kuttychattan Theyyam: This type of Theyyam is performed to appease the Karinkali deity, who is believed to be a fierce goddess who protects the village from evil forces.
 Chamundi Kuttychattan Theyyam: This Theyyam is performed to appease the Chamundi deity, who is believed to be a powerful goddess who can cure diseases and protect the village from epidemics
 Chirakkal Kottayil Theyyam: This type of Kuttychattan Theyyam is performed to appease the Chirakkal Kottayil deity, who is believed to be the protector of the village and the crops.
 Poothadi Kuttychattan Theyyam: This Theyyam is performed to appease the Poothadi deity, who is believed to be a powerful god who can cure diseases and protect the village from evil forces.
 Thondachan Kuttychattan Theyyam: This type of Theyyam is performed to appease the Thondachan deity, who is believed to be the protector of the village and the crops.
 Veeran Kuttychattan Theyyam: This Theyyam is performed to appease the Veeran deity, who is believed to be a powerful god who can cure diseases and protect the village from evil forces.
 Kurumathoor Kuttychattan Theyyam: This type of Theyyam is performed to appease the Kurumathoor Kuttychattan deity, who is believed to be a protector of the village and the people.
 Kunnathurpadi Kuttychattan Theyyam: This Theyyam is performed to appease the Kunnathurpadi Kuttychattan deity, who is believed to be a powerful god who can cure diseases and protect the village from evil forces
 Kuzhichalil Kuttychattan Theyyam: This type of Kuttychattan Theyyam is performed to appease the Kuzhichalil Kuttychattan deity, who is believed to be the protector of the village and the people.
 Manivathoor Kuttychattan Theyyam: This Theyyam is performed to appease the Manivathoor Kuttychattan deity, who is believed to be a protector of the village and the crops.
 Nariyalam Kuttychattan Theyyam: This type of Kuttychattan Theyyam is performed to appease the Nariyalam Kuttychattan deity, who is believed to be a powerful god who can cure diseases and protect the village from evil forces.
 Panayal Kuttychattan Theyyam: This Theyyam is performed to appease the Panayal Kuttychattan deity, who is believed to be the protector of the village and the crops.
 Poyilakkavu Kuttychattan Theyyam: This type of Kuttychattan Theyyam is performed to appease the Poyilakkavu Kuttychattan deity, who is believed to be a protector of the village and the people.
 Thrichambaram Kuttychattan Theyyam: This Theyyam is performed to appease the Thrichambaram Kuttychattan deity, who is believed to be a powerful god who can cure diseases and protect the village from evil forces.

Each type of Kuttychattan Theyyam has its unique rituals and performances.

References

Wikipedia malayalam: 
തെയ്യം 
Kuttichathan Theyyam from the original on February 15, 2023 Retrieved 2023-03-14

External links

Regional Hindu gods
Theyyam
Kerala folklore
Hindu folk deities